Wraxall Camp, or Failand Camp, is a small round earthwork in Somerset. The remains are indistinct and thickly covered by woods, but it appears to have been an Iron Age farmstead, and not a defensive structure.

Location

Wraxall Camp is a scheduled monument in the parish of Wraxall and Failand in North Somerset, in an upland region of carboniferous limestone.
There may be traces of ancient agriculture between the camp and Manor Farm to the north, and the earthwork may be connected with the remains of a field system south and southwest of Manor Farm.

Partial excavations in 1928 found sherds of black burnished pottery and a Kimmeridge shale bracelet, typical of rural settlements in the Iron Age.
The finds, placed in the University of Bristol Spelæological Society Museum in Bristol, were destroyed by bombing in World War II (1939–45).
Many worked flints have been found in the fields around the camp.
The site is thickly covered in trees.

Structure

From its location on relatively high but level ground the camp seems most likely to have been a farmstead, and not defensive.
Minor earthworks mark the homes in the interior, which were surrounded by a bank and ditch.
There may be an entrance in the southwest of the enclosure.

Notes

Sources

External links

Archaeological sites in Somerset
Iron Age sites in Somerset